The Oracle Encyclopædia is a five-volume general encyclopedia. It was published in 1895 in London by George Newnes Ltd and edited by R. W. Egerton Eastwick.

References 

Reference works in the public domain
English-language encyclopedias
British encyclopedias
1895 non-fiction books
19th-century encyclopedias
George Newnes Ltd books